Illusion Suite is an album by American pianist and composer Stanley Cowell recorded in 1972 and released on the ECM label.

Reception
The Allmusic review by Andrew Hamilton rated the album 4 stars, stating: "Cowell and Clarke display amazing technique ...and Hopps' impressionistic drumming is head clearing. ...Hopps plays as if he has four hands with a drumstick in each, Cowell's rolling piano chords are matched in fever by Clarke's bass work".

Track listing
All compositions by Stanley Cowell
 "Maimoun" - 7:47
 "Ibn Mukhtarr Mustapha" - 4:49
 "Cal Massey" - 6:06
 "Miss Viki" -5:22
 "Emil Danenberg" - 8:29
 "Astral Spiritual" - 7:38

Personnel
Stanley Cowell — piano
Stanley Clarke — bass 
Jimmy Hopps — drums

References

ECM Records albums
Stanley Cowell albums
1973 albums
Albums produced by Manfred Eicher